Car mirror may refer to:

 Rear-view mirror, a mirror in vehicles that allows the driver to see rearwards
 Wing mirror, or side mirror, a mirror on the exterior of vehicles